Acidocroton is a genus of plants under the family Euphorbiaceae first described with this name in 1859. It is native to Colombia and the Greater Antilles.

Etymologically, the name Acidocroton means "sour croton".

Species

formerly included
moved to Ophellantha 
 Acidocroton spinosus - Ophellantha spinosa  
 Acidocroton steyermarkii - Ophellantha steyermarkii

References

Codiaeae
Euphorbiaceae genera